Crassula lactea known as Taylor's Parches is a perennial flowering plant native to southern Africa. It blooms in the winter with white flowers.

References

lactea
Flora of Southern Africa